Karo Regency is a landlocked regency of North Sumatra, Indonesia, situated in the Barisan Mountains. Its regency seat is Kabanjahe. The Batak Karo language is spoken in the regency, as well as the Indonesian language. It borders Southeast Aceh Regency in Aceh to the west, Deli Serdang Regency and Langkat Regency to the north, Dairi Regency and Toba Samosir Regency to the south, and Deli Serdang Regency and Simalungun Regency to the east.

Economy 

The GDP per capita of Karo Regency in 2005 was 11.65 million rupiah, approximately US$1,200. 74% of the population work in agriculture, which comprises 60% of regional GDP. The second-largest sector is government, which comprises 11% of the regional GDP.

Administrative divisions 
The regency is divided administratively into seventeen districts (kecamatan), tabulated below with their areas and their populations at the 2010 Census and the 2020 Census. The table also includes the locations of the district administrative centres, the number of administrative villages (rural desa and urban kelurahan) in each district, and its post codes.

Note that four of these districts (indicated by "*" above) constitute a part of the Medan metropolitan area.

References 

 
Batak Karo
Regencies of North Sumatra